Shiraj Mahalleh-ye Kuchak (also Romanized as Shīraj Maḩalleh-ye Kūchak) is a village in Mir Shams ol Din Rural District, in the Central District of Tonekabon County, Mazandaran Province, Iran. At the 2006 census, its population was 58, in 19 families.

References 

Populated places in Tonekabon County